Gabriel Mas (born 9 March 1933) is a Spanish former racing cyclist. In 1960 he won the Vuelta a Andalucía.

References

External links
 

1933 births
Living people
Spanish male cyclists
Sportspeople from Mallorca
Cyclists from the Balearic Islands